Souagui is a town and commune in Médéa Province, Algeria. According to the 1998 census it has a population of 19,059.

History
Four kilometers east of the city, excavations in 1927 made it possible to find on the site of Ain Tamda the ruins of a Christian monastery and a church, which date from the 4th century.    Aïn-Tamda is the site of the Roman town of Tamada.

References

Communes of Médéa Province
Cities in Algeria
Algeria